The 1966 Campeonato Paulista de Futebol da Divisão Especial de Profissionais, organized by the Federação Paulista de Futebol, was the 65th season of São Paulo's top professional football league. Palmeiras won the title for the 15th time. Bragantino and Noroeste were relegated and the top scorer was Santos's Toninho Guerreiro with 27 goals.

Championship
The championship was disputed in a double-round robin system, with the team with the most points winning the title and the two teams with the fewest points being relegated.

Playouts

Top Scores

References

Campeonato Paulista seasons
Paulista